Clarence "Taffy" Abel Arena is a 4,000-seat hockey arena in Sault Ste. Marie, Michigan on the campus of Lake Superior State University. It is home to the Lake Superior State Lakers men's ice hockey team of the Central Collegiate Hockey Association. The arena is part of the Norris Center student athletic complex, which was built in 1976 and includes the 2,500-seat Cooper Gymnasium and other sports facilities for the school. The arena itself dates back to 1976; it was renovated and remodeled to its current larger form in the summer of 1995 following the Lakers' run of three national championships and eight straight NCAA tournament appearances, which continued into the first year of the arena. It was named after American ice hockey player Clarence "Taffy" Abel, who was born in Sault Ste. Marie. It is the only on-campus hockey arena in the United States which has a seating capacity greater than the enrollment of the school for which it is used.

Both Abel Arena and Cooper Gym are available for other events, including high school basketball and hockey.

External links 
Official page
Norris Center at cstv.com

Indoor arenas in Michigan
College ice hockey venues in the United States
Indoor ice hockey venues in the United States
Sports venues in Michigan
Ontario Hockey League arenas
Lake Superior State Lakers men's ice hockey
Sports venues completed in 1976
1976 establishments in Michigan